The 2008 Boston Marathon was the 112th running of the annual marathon race in Boston, United States and was held on April 21. The elite men's race was won by Kenya's Robert Kipkoech Cheruiyot in a time of 2:07:46 hours and the women's race was won by Ethiopia's Dire Tune in 2:25:25.

Results

Men

Women

References

Men's results. Association of Road Racing Statisticians. Retrieved 2020-04-10.
Women's results. Association of Road Racing Statisticians. Retrieved 2020-04-10.

External links

 Boston Athletic Association website

Boston Marathon
Boston
Boston Marathon
Marathon
Boston Marathon